Berjaya Times Square Theme Park (formerly Cosmo's World) is an indoor amusement park on the 5th to 8th floors of Berjaya Times Square, Kuala Lumpur, Malaysia. It was conceived as the "largest indoor, all weather, all ages, entertainment destination in the region" and is the second largest indoor amusement park in Asia.

Amenities

Inside the amusement park, many amenities are open during operational hours including shopping, food and beverages, Kidz Theatre, Entertainment Stages, Kidz Playground, and Cosmo's Party World.

Rides
With 22 rides, Berjaya Times Square Theme Park is divided into two differently themed areas, Galaxy Station and Fantasy Garden.

References

External links

 https://www.berjayatimessquarethemeparkkl.com/
 http://www.timeoutkl.com/kids/venues/Cosmos-World-Theme-Park

Amusement parks in Malaysia
Berjaya Times Square
Indoor amusement parks
Tourist attractions in Kuala Lumpur